The Illusionist is a 1983 Dutch comedy film directed by Jos Stelling and starring Freek de Jonge. The film has no dialogue. It won the Golden Calf for Best Feature Film at the 1984 Netherlands Film Festival. The film was loosely based on a theater show by de Jonge called De Tragiek from 1980.

Plot
It tells the story of a family with two sons. One of which is sent to a psychiatric hospital and the other looks for him there.

Cast
 Freek de Jonge as the illusionist
 Jim van der Woude as brother
 Catrien Wolthuizen as mother
 Gerard Thoolen as father
 Carel Lapere as grandfather
 Craig Eubanks as magician
 Gerrie van der Klei as assistant

References

External links
 

1983 films
1980s Dutch-language films
1983 comedy films
Films directed by Jos Stelling
Films about magic and magicians
Films without speech
Dutch comedy films